Mason Island (Gaeilge: Oileán Máisean) is an uninhabited island located off the Galway coast near the village of Carna.

History 
The island has been uninhabited since 1957, but used to be home to 114 people.
There are some abandoned properties on the island and some refurbished holiday homes which are available for rental. The island is not serviced by any ferries.
Some early Christian relics have also been found on the island.

References

Uninhabited islands of Ireland
Islands of County Galway